Phase 1 is a studio album by Saga, released on 22 April 1998.

Phase 1 was originally recorded in 1978. It is a fan only release that was made available through The Saga Club. It contains the demo versions of "You're Not Alone", "Mouse in a Maze" and "Hot to Cold". These versions are played live and are not re-mixed or dubbed. It also contains 5 new previously unreleased songs.

Track listing

References

1998 albums
Saga (band) albums
SPV/Steamhammer albums